A police cadet can refer either to a trainee police officer or to a member of a youth organisation in which young people learn about and/or participate in law enforcement and police work.

Many police departments in the United States offer police cadet programmes, as do a number of police forces in the United Kingdom.

See also
 Law Enforcement Exploring
 Police cadets in the United Kingdom

Law enforcement